The 1929 Boston Bulldogs season was their fifth and final season in the league and their only season after changing their name from the Pottsville Maroons. The team improved on their previous output of 2–8, winning four games. They finished fourth in the league.Based at Braves Field, the Bulldogs nonetheless hosted their two-game swan song back in their old stomping grounds, defeating both the Buffalo Bison on October 27 at Minersville Park and the Newark Tornadoes on October 29 at Pottsville's Mitchell Field.

Schedule

Standings

References

Boston Bulldogs (NFL) seasons
Boston Bulldogs
Boston